Uceda is a municipality located in the province of Guadalajara, Castile-La Mancha, Spain. According to the 2004 census (INE), the municipality has a population of 1,575 inhabitants. The church of Santa María de la Varga stands in the town.

References 

Municipalities in the Province of Guadalajara